Georges Canguilhem (4 June 1904 – 11 September 1995) was a French philosopher and physician who specialized in epistemology and the philosophy of science (in particular, biology).

Life and work
Canguilhem entered the École Normale Supérieure in 1924 as part of a class that included Jean-Paul Sartre, Raymond Aron and Paul Nizan. He aggregated in 1927 and then taught in lycées throughout France, taking up the study of medicine while teaching in Toulouse.

He took up a post at the Clermont-Ferrand based University of Strasbourg in 1941, and received his medical doctorate in 1943, in the middle of World War II. Using the pseudonym "Lafont" Canguilhem became active in the French Resistance, serving as a doctor in Auvergne.

By 1948 he was the French equivalent of department chair in philosophy at Strasbourg as well. Seven years later, he was named a professor at the Sorbonne and succeeded Gaston Bachelard as the director of the Institut d'histoire des sciences, a post he occupied until 1971, at which time he undertook an active emeritus career.

In 1983 he was awarded the Sarton Medal by the History of Science Society. In 1987 he received the médaille d'or, awarded by the Centre national de la recherche scientifique (CNRS).

Philosophy of biology

Canguilhem's principal work in philosophy of science is presented in two books, Le Normal et le pathologique, first published in 1943 and then expanded in 1968, and La Connaissance de la vie (1952). Le Normal et le pathologique is an extended exploration into the nature and meaning of normality in medicine and biology, the production and institutionalization of medical knowledge. It is still a seminal work in medical anthropology and the history of ideas, and is widely influential in part thanks to Canguilhem's influence on Michel Foucault. La Connaissance de la vie is an extended study of the specificity of biology as a science, the historical and conceptual significance of vitalism, and the possibility of conceiving organisms not on the basis of mechanical and technical models that would reduce the organism to a machine, but rather on the basis of the organism's relation to the milieu in which it lives, its successful survival in this milieu, and its status as something greater than "the sum of its parts". Canguilhem argued strongly for these positions, criticising 18th and 19th century vitalism (and its politics) but also cautioning against the reduction of biology to a "physical science." He believed such a reduction deprived biology of a proper field of study, ideologically transforming living beings into mechanical structures serving a chemical/physical equilibrium that cannot account for the particularity of organisms or for the complexity of life. He furthered and altered these critiques in a later book, Ideology and Rationality in the History of the Life Sciences.

Canguilhem was originally hostile to the ideas of Henri Bergson and vitalism but was later influenced by them and developed his own "idiosyncratic brand of vitalism."

More than just a great theoretician, Canguilhem was one of the few philosophers of the 20th century to develop an approach that was shaped by a medical education. He helped define a method of studying the history of science which was practical and rigorous. His work focused on the one hand on the concepts of "normal" and "pathological" and, on the other, a critical history of the formation of concepts such as "reflex" in the history of science. Canguilhem was also a mentor to several French scholars, most notably Foucault, for whom he served as a sponsor in the presentation of Histoire de la folie à l'âge classique (History of Madness) for the Doctorat d'État and whose work he followed throughout the latter's life.

Institutional role 
As Inspector General and then President of the Jury d'Agrégation in philosophy, Canguilhem had a tremendous and direct influence over philosophical instruction in France in the latter half of the twentieth century and was known to more than a generation of French academic philosophers as a demanding and exacting evaluator who, as Louis Althusser remarked, believed he could correct the philosophical understanding of teachers by bawling them out. This belief did not prevent him from being regarded with considerable affection by the generation of intellectuals that came to the fore in the 1960s, including Jacques Derrida, Michel Foucault, Louis Althusser, and Jacques Lacan. Althusser once wrote to his English translator that "my debt to Canguilhem is incalculable" (italics in the original, from Economy and Society 27, page 171). Likewise, Foucault, in his introduction to Canguilhem's The Normal and the Pathological, wrote:

Take away Canguilhem and you will no longer understand much about Althusser, Althusserism and a whole series of discussions which have taken place among French Marxists; you will no longer grasp what is specific to sociologists such as Bourdieu, Castel, Passeron and what marks them so strongly within sociology; you will miss an entire aspect of the theoretical work done by psychoanalysts, particularly by the followers of Lacan. Further, in the entire discussion of ideas which preceded or followed the movement of '68, it is easy to find the place of those who, from near or from afar, had been trained by Canguilhem.

Derrida recalled that Canguilhem advised him early in his career that he would have to distinguish himself as a serious scholar before he could exhibit professionally the particular philosophical sense of humour for which he is at turns famous and notorious, advice which Derrida seemed to have taken in earnest.

After years of neglect, a great deal of Canguilhem's writings have been translated into English. Among them are his celebrated works The Normal and the Pathological and Knowledge of Life as well as two collections of essays, titled A Vital Rationalist and Writings on Medicine.

Bibliography 
 Essai sur quelques problèmes concernant le normal et le pathologique (1943), re-published with the title Le normal et le pathologique, augmenté de Nouvelles réflexions concernant le normal et le pathologique (1966).
 La connaissance de la vie (1952).
 La formation du concept de réflexe aux XVIIe et XVIIIe siècles (1955).
 Du développement à l’évolution au XIXe siècle (1962).
 Etudes d’histoire et de philosophie des sciences (1968).
 Vie et Régulation, articles contributed to Encyclopaedia Universalis (1974).
 Idéologie et rationalité dans l’histoire des sciences de la vie (1977).
 La santé, concept vulgaire et question philosophique (1988).

Translations into English
Ideology and Rationality in the History of the Life Sciences, trans. Arthur Goldhammer (Cambridge: MIT Press, 1988).
The Normal and the Pathological, trans. Carolyn R. Fawcett & Robert S. Cohen (New York: Zone Books, 1991).
Machine and Organism, trans. Mark Cohen & Randall Cherry, in "Incorporations" Ed. by Jonathan Crary and Sanford Kwinter (New York: Zone Books, 1992).
A Vital Rationalist: Selected Writings, trans. Arthur Goldhammer (New York: Zone Books, 1994).
Knowledge of Life, trans. Stefanos Geroulanos and Daniela Ginsburg (New York:  Fordham UP, 2008).
Writings on Medicine, trans. Stefanos Geroulanos and Todd Meyers (New York: Fordham UP, 2012).

Notes

Further reading 
 Dagognet, François, Georges Canguilhem: Philosophie de la vie (Paris: 1997).
 Elden, Stuart. Canguilhem (Polity Press, 2019). 
 Foucault, Michel, "Introduction" to Canguilhem, The Normal and the Pathological.
 Geroulanos, Stefanos, Transparency in Postwar France (Stanford University Press, 2017), 64-90, 194-225.
 Geroulanos, Stefanos, and Todd Meyers, "Georges Canguilhem’s Critique of Medical Reason", in Georges Canguilhem, Writings on Medicine (Fordham University Press, 2012), 1-24.
 
 Gutting, Gary, "Canguilhem's history of science" in Michel Foucault's Archaeology of Scientific Reason: Science and the History of Reason (Cambridge University Press, 1989), pp. 32–52.
 Horton, R., "Georges Canguilhem: Philosopher of Disease," Journal of the Royal Society of Medicine 88 (1995): 316–319.
 Lecourt, Dominique, Georges Canguilhem, Paris, PUF/Que sais je ?, February 2008.
 Rabinow, Paul, "Introduction: A Vital Rationalist," in Canguilhem, A Vital Rationalist: Selected Writings.
 Roudinesco, Elisabeth, Philosophy in Turbulent Times: Canguilhem, Sartre, Foucault, Althusser, Deleuze, Derrida, Columbia University Press, New York, 2008.
Talcott, Samuel. Georges Canguilhem and the Problem of Error (Palgrave Macmillan, 2019).
 Georges Canguilhem, philosophe, historien des sciences, Actes du colloque organisé au Palais de la Découverte les 6, 7 et 8 décembre 1990 par Étienne Balibar, M. Cardot, F. Duroux, M. Fichant, Dominique Lecourt et J. Roubaud, Bibliothèque du Collège International de Philosophie/Albin Michel, Paris, 1993, .
 Economy and Society 27:2–3 (1998). Special issue dedicated to Canguilhem.
Xavier Roth, Georges Canguilhem et l'unité de l'expérience. Juger et agir (1926-1939), collection L'histoire des sciences - textes et études , Paris, Vrin, 2013

External links
 Centre Georges Canguilhem
 Georges Canguilhem, 1904-1995 Obituary by David Macey (pdf format).
 Georges Canguilhem Biography by Jim Marshall, University of Auckland.

1904 births
1995 deaths
20th-century essayists
20th-century French historians
20th-century French non-fiction writers
20th-century French philosophers
20th-century male writers
20th-century French physicians
Continental philosophers
École Normale Supérieure alumni
Epistemologists
French male essayists
French male writers
French male non-fiction writers
French Resistance members
Historians of science
Metaphysicians
Ontologists
People from Castelnaudary
Philosophers of education
Philosophers of history
Philosophers of science
Rationalists
Vitalists